The Arch Islands (Spanish: Islotes Franceses) are a group of small islands, off Port Albemarle on West Falkland in the Falkland Islands. They are uninhabited, and accessible only by boat. They are so called because the largest of the group has a natural arch in it, large enough to allow a fair sized boat through.

The islands include:

 Big Arch Island
 Clump Island
 Tussac Island
 Pyramid Rock
 Last Rock
 Albemarle Rock

References

Islands of the Falkland Islands
Natural arches
Uninhabited islands of the Falkland Islands